The MV Safmarine Asia is a ship operated by the South African shipping company Safmarine that was unsuccessfully attacked by Somali pirates on 14 April 2009. The French frigate  responded to the vessel's distress call, and in the process, found and apprehended 11 Somali pirates. There were tried for piracy in Kenya. The pirates were then landed at Mombasa for trial in Kenya on 22 April 2009.

References

Piracy in Somalia
Gulf of Aden
1985 ships